Guess My Story may refer to:
 Guess My Story (Canadian TV series), 1954
 Guess My Story (British TV series), 1953-1955